Egaleo is a station of Athens Metro Line 3.

Station layout

References

Athens Metro stations
Railway stations opened in 2007
2007 establishments in Greece